James Riley Alexander (September 3, 1930 – August 19, 2019) was an American sound engineer.

Alexander was born in Los Angeles, California and served in the United States Army as a communications specialist. Alexander was commissioned a sergeant. He was nominated for two Academy Awards in the Category Best Sound.

Selected filmography
 Coal Miner's Daughter (1980)
 Terms of Endearment (1983)

References

External links

1930 births
2019 deaths
American audio engineers
People from Los Angeles
Military personnel from California